John Michael Babinecz (born July 27, 1950) is a former American football linebacker in the National Football League for the Dallas Cowboys, Houston Oilers and Chicago Bears. He also was a member of the Winnipeg Blue Bombers in the Canadian Football League. He played college football at Villanova University.

Early years
Babinecz attended Central Catholic High School where he played as a tight end and linebacker, receiving All-Catholic honors in his last two years. He also was the State Catholic champion in the shot put. He is of Polish descent.

He accepted a football scholarship from Villanova University, where he became a three-year starter and a three-time All-East selection at middle linebacker. In 2003, the school retired his #64 jersey.

Professional career

Dallas Cowboys
Babinecz was selected by the Dallas Cowboys in the second round (39th overall) of the 1972 NFL Draft. As a rookie, he played on special teams in all 14 games.

In 1973, he played on special teams, while backing up Dave Edwards and D. D. Lewis at outside linebacker. He suffered a broken hand during training camp that slowed his progress and also missed 2 regular season games with a pulled back muscle. He was placed on injured waivers (sprained hip and knee) after the first game of the 1974 season.

Houston Oilers
In 1974, Babinecz was claimed by the Houston Oilers and spent the season on the injured reserve list. He was released on September 14, 1975.

Chicago Bears
On September 16, 1975, he was claimed by the Chicago Bears. He appeared in 14 games in a reserve role. He wasn't re-signed after the season.

Philadelphia Eagles
On June 29, 1976, he signed with the Philadelphia Eagles as a free agent. He was waived on August 2.

Atlanta Falcons
On August 10, 1976, he was claimed off waivers by the Atlanta Falcons. On August 23, he was released before the start of the season.

Winnipeg Blue Bombers (CFL)
On September 16, 1976, he signed with the Winnipeg Blue Bombers after a five-day tryout. On August 28, 1977, he was released to be able to enter medical school in September.

Personal life
Babinecz worked as a pediatrician in Paoli, Pennsylvania.

References

1950 births
Living people
Players of American football from Pittsburgh
Players of Canadian football from Pittsburgh
American football linebackers
American people of Polish descent
Villanova Wildcats football players
Dallas Cowboys players
Houston Oilers players
Chicago Bears players
Winnipeg Blue Bombers players
Central Catholic High School (Pittsburgh) alumni